Eric Charles Leckner (born May 27, 1966) is a retired American professional basketball player who was selected by the Utah Jazz in the first round (17th overall) of the 1988 NBA Draft. He attended Mira Costa High School in Manhattan Beach, California, and played collegiately at the University of Wyoming.

A center, Leckner played in 8 NBA seasons for the Utah Jazz, Sacramento Kings, Charlotte Hornets, Philadelphia 76ers, Detroit Pistons and Vancouver Grizzlies. His best year as a pro was during the 1993-94 season when he appeared in 71 games and averaged 5.1 ppg for the 76ers.

College career
At Wyoming, Leckner had a successful career, finishing as the career leader in blocked shots and third leading scorer in Cowboys history. He accumulated 1,938 points, 774 rebounds and 164 blocked shots. He also holds the current University of Wyoming records for games played at 131 and field goal percentage at 61.2%. As a sophomore, he was a member of the Wyoming team that qualified for the finals at the 1986 National Invitation Tournament. The following year, the Cowboys qualified for the Sweet Sixteen of the 1987 NCAA Men's Division I Basketball Tournament. Leckner was inducted into the University of Wyoming Athletics Hall of Fame on September 25, 1998.

Awards and honors
Leckner won numerous awards during his career. The following are some of his achievements:
 First Team All-Western Athletic Conference (1987, 1988)
 Western Athletic Conference Tournament MVP (1986, 1987, 1988)
 Inducted into the University of Wyoming Athletics Hall of Fame (Individual, 1998) and (Team, 2011)
 Inducted into Mira Costa High School Athletic Hall of Fame (2020)

Personal life
Eric Leckner married Jessica Kelly Lucason (born Boston, MA) in 2004.  They have four children and reside in Charlotte, NC, moving there in 2015 after eleven years in Manhattan Beach, CA.

References

External links
NBA stats @ basketballreference.com

1966 births
Living people
American expatriate basketball people in Argentina
American expatriate basketball people in Canada
American expatriate basketball people in Greece
American expatriate basketball people in Italy
American men's basketball players
Basketball players from Inglewood, California
Centers (basketball)
Charlotte Hornets players
Detroit Pistons players
Libertad de Sunchales basketball players
Peristeri B.C. players
Philadelphia 76ers players
Sacramento Kings players
Universiade medalists in basketball
Universiade silver medalists for the United States
Utah Jazz draft picks
Utah Jazz players
Vancouver Grizzlies players
Wyoming Cowboys basketball players